Roller Coaster – also known as Scenic Railway or The Scenic – is a wooden roller coaster at Great Yarmouth Pleasure Beach, Great Yarmouth, UK. The ride was built at the park in 1932 and has been operational since. It is one of only two scenic railways still in operation in the UK (the other being the Scenic Railway at Dreamland Amusement Park, Margate) and one of only seven in the world. In common with most scenic railways, an operator rides the car. Traditionally referred to as a 'brakeman’, the operator applies brakes on the car to control its speed and to stop it at the end of the ride, as there are no brakes on the track. It is the second tallest and second fastest wooden roller coaster in the UK. It is also a Grade II listed building.

History
In 1931, Pat Collins, then owner of Pleasure Beach, and his son John, who was managing the park, were on the lookout for a large attraction to install at the park. The Collins' visited the Colonial Exhibition in Paris where there was an amusement park among the attractions. The largest ride there was a scenic railway being operated by German showman Hugo Haase. At the close of the Exhibition, Collins purchased the ride for Pleasure Beach and it was dismantled, shipped to England and erected in the park. The ride opened on 14 May 1932.

The Ride
The ride's superstructure is entirely timber, predominantly fir and pine, and is clad in steel sheets. Like most scenic railways, it was originally clad in plaster and concrete sculpted to resemble mountainous terrain. The track is wooden and the running rails are in a trough with walkways either side. The ride is often called a side-friction coaster, which is misleading as the train makes no contact with the side walls of the track and the running wheels are flanged like those of railway vehicles. The ride features two large drops, the first one of which is a 'headchopper' where the train dives under some of the support structure of the ride. There are also other large drops and a bunnyhop sequence which gives very good air-time both at the front and back of the train. In total there are nine drops. A typical ride time is 3:10, but can vary depending on the styles of the particular brakemen.

There are five trains, although only three are currently in operation. Each train is made up of three cars, each of which has five 2-person bench seats, allowing 30 riders per train. There are manual lap-bars and grab rails for each seat. The brakeman rides between the first and second cars. The brakeman moderates the speed of the train as necessary, depending on the conditions to ensure it arrives in the station at the end of the ride at a safe speed. Unlike modern roller coasters, there are no brakes on the track at all.

Popularity
The ride is the most popular attraction at the Pleasure Beach; its popularity largely due to its uniqueness. The ride is an ACE Coaster Classic, along with the Scenic Railway at Luna Park, Melbourne, Australia; the only operational scenic railways to obtain this status. A copy of the ride was made by the Collins', which ended up at their amusement park in Barry Island, where it operated from 1940 until 1973.

Part of the music video for the 1982 single House of Fun by Madness was filmed at the Pleasure Beach with the band seen riding on the Roller Coaster.

Gallery

References

External links
Official site of Great Yarmouth Pleasure Beach
Image set of the Scenic on Flickr

Out and back roller coasters
Roller coasters in the United Kingdom
Wooden roller coasters
Great Yarmouth
Roller coasters with brakemen
Relocated buildings and structures in the United Kingdom
Paris Colonial Exposition